Álvaro Lozano Moncada (born May 14, 1964 in Cúcuta, Norte de Santander) is a Colombian road racing cyclist.

Career

1990
3rd in  National Championships, Road, Elite, Colombia, Bogota (COL)  
1991
1st in Combination Classification Volta a Portugal (POR)  
1993
1st in General Classification Clasico Ciclistico Banfoandes (VEN)  
1994
1st in General Classification Clasico Ciclistico Banfoandes (VEN)  
1996
3rd in  National Championships, Road, Elite, Colombia (COL)  
2nd in General Classification Clásico RCN (COL)  
1997
1st in General Classification Clásico Virgen de la Consolación de Táriba (VEN)  
3rd in General Classification Vuelta a Venezuela (VEN)  
1998
1st in General Classification Clásico Virgen de la Consolación de Táriba (VEN)  
1st in Stage 13 Vuelta a Venezuela (VEN)  
1st in Stage 15 Vuelta a Venezuela (VEN)  
1st in General Classification Vuelta a Venezuela (VEN)  
1st in Stage 12 Vuelta al Táchira, San Cristóbal (VEN)  
2nd in General Classification Vuelta al Táchira (VEN)  
1st in General Classification Vuelta Internacional al Estado Trujillo (VEN)  
2000
3rd in  National Championships, Road, Elite, Colombia (COL)  
2nd in  National Championships, Road, ITT, Elite, Colombia (COL)  
1st in General Classification Vuelta a Venezuela (VEN)  
4th in General Classification Clásico RCN (COL)
2001
3rd in General Classification Clasico Ciclistico Banfoandes (VEN)   
2002  
1st in Stage 13 Vuelta a Venezuela, Barquisimeto criterium (VEN)  
1st in Stage 1 Vuelta a Costa Rica, Turrialba (CRC)  
2003
6th in General Classification Vuelta a Venezuela (VEN)  
2004
1st in Stage 3 Clásico RCN, Ibagué (COL)

References
 

1964 births
Living people
People from Cúcuta
Colombian male cyclists
Vuelta a Venezuela stage winners
20th-century Colombian people